The Andean catfish (Astroblepus ubidiai) is a species of freshwater fish in the family Astroblepidae. The Spanish name for the Andean catfish is preñadilla. It is endemic to the highlands of the Ecuadorian Andes where it lives in mountain streams in four different drainage basins in the Imbakucha watershed. The fish is threatened by human activities in the area with loss and fragmentation of its habitat, and the International Union for Conservation of Nature has assessed its conservation status as being "critically endangered".

Description
The Andean catfish's natural habitats are the mountainous rivers, freshwater springs or aquifers, caves and inland karsts of four different drainage basins within the Imbakucha watershed. It is brownish gray in colour and has no scales; large adults can grow up to 150 mm. Like all other catfishes, it has barbels around the mouth which contain taste buds that help the animal find food at night. Its diet consists of other fish, frogs, snails, algae, and other aquatic organisms.

Status
The species is critically endangered by habitat loss, pollution, and fishing. Habitat loss has fragmented its population; natural and anthropogenic barriers, such as pasture grounds, fields, human settlements, and the presence of predators such as piscivorous large mouth bass in Imbakucha Lake have resulted in the segregation of its six subpopulations and limit their probabilities of escape to other refugia when the environment deteriorates.

Sources

References

External links
 

Astroblepus
Fish of the Andes
Catfish of South America
Endemic fauna of Ecuador
Freshwater fish of Ecuador
Critically endangered fish
Critically endangered biota of South America
Fish described in 1931
Taxonomy articles created by Polbot